"These Are the Ways" is a song by American rock band Red Hot Chili Peppers that was released on March 31, 2022 and is the second single from their twelfth studio album, Unlimited Love.

Music video
A music video was released simultaneously with the single, directed by Malia James and with the participation of Dina Shihabi. The video finds Anthony Kiedis leading cops on a wild chase through backyards, house parties, in and out of apartments and past paparazzi after stealing items from a convenience store. Flea's wife, Melody Ehsani, also makes an appearance in the video along with stunt coordinator Airon Armstrong (who played Michael Myers in Halloween Kills) as one of the cops.

Live performances
The song made its live debut on April 1, 2022 on Jimmy Kimmel Live and has been played at nearly every show on the band's Global Stadium Tour.

Personnel
Red Hot Chili Peppers
Anthony Kiedis – lead vocals
Flea – bass guitar
Chad Smith – drums
John Frusciante – guitar, backing vocals

Charts

Release history

References

2022 singles
2022 songs
Red Hot Chili Peppers songs
Songs written by Anthony Kiedis
Songs written by Flea (musician)
Songs written by Chad Smith
Songs written by John Frusciante